Meredith J. C. Warren (born in Vancouver, British Columbia) is a Senior Lecturer in Biblical and Religious Studies at the University of Sheffield. She is known for her views on the New Testament and early Judaism as well as for her media appearances for such outlets as The Washington Post, and BBC radio. She is a Metis citizen of the Manitoba Metis Federation.

Education and career
Warren obtained her Bachelor of Arts (2004) and Master of Arts (2006) from McGill University. She earned a PhD in 2013 from McGill in religious studies, specializing in New Testament, early Judaism, and ancient Mediterranean religions. She was awarded a postdoctoral fellowship from the Fonds de recherche du Québec, before taking her position at Sheffield University.  She also serves as an associate editor for the Enoch Seminar Online Reviews.

Warren's scholarly publications include a book and articles on Jesus, food, and clothing in early Christianity and early Judaism.
Warren has contributed to The Washington Post and The Independent on the subject of the Historical Jesus. She has been interviewed by BBC Radio and the Star on the New Testament and Jesus. She has also given interviews on NPR and to The Guardian about the changes to the Lord's Prayer in 2019.

Warren served as an adjunct professor of Religious Studies at McGill University from 2007 to 2015. In 2015 she was appointed as a lecturer in Biblical and Religious Studies at the University of Sheffield's Institute for Interdisciplinary Biblical Studies. Warren was honored with a Senate Award for Excellence in Learning and Teaching by the University of Sheffield in 2019. In 2020 she was elected to the Studiorum Novi Testamenti Societas (Society of New Testament Studies).

Works

Books 
Warren, Meredith, Sara Parks, and Shayna Sheinfeld (2022). Jewish and Christian Women in the Ancient Mediterranean. London: Routledge. ISBN 9781138543782

Journal articles 
 ———. (2020) ""Confronting Judeophobia in the Classroom," with Sarah E. Rollens and Eric Vanden Eykel. Journal for Interdisciplinary Biblical Studies 2.1: 81–106.
 ———. (2018) "The Cup of God’s Wrath: Libation in Revelation and Early Christian Meal Practice" Religions 9.413. Special Issue: Sacrifice and Religion; Daniel Ullucci, ed.
———. (2017) "Tasting the Little Scroll: A Sensory Analysis of Divine Interaction in Revelation 10:8–10." Journal for the Study of the New Testament 40.1: 101–119.

Book chapters 
 ———. (2020) "Domestic Spaces in Late Ancient Judaism" in A Companion to Late Ancient Judaism. Naomi Koltun-Fromm and Gwynn Kessler, eds.; Wiley-Blackwell Press. 
 ———. (2018) "‘When the Christ appears, will he do more signs than this man has done?’ (John 7:31): Signs and the Messiah in the Gospel of John" in Reading the Gospel of John’s Christology as a Form of Jewish Messianism: Royal, Prophetic, and Divine Messiahs. Benjamin Reynolds and Gabriele Boccaccini, eds.; Leiden: Brill. Pp 229–247.
———. (2017) "Human and Divine Justice in the Testament of Abraham" in The Embroidered Bible: Studies in Biblical Apocrypha and Pseudepigrapha in Honour of Michael E. Stone. Edited by Lorenzo DiTommaso, Matthias Henze, and William Adler. Studia in Veteris Testamenti Pseudepigrapha; Leiden: E.J. Brill.
———. (2017) "Tastes from Beyond: Persephone’s Pomegranate and Otherworldly Consumption in Antiquity" in Taste and the Ancient Senses. The Senses in Antiquity; Kelli C. Rudolph, ed; Routledge Press.

Dictionary, Lexicon, and Encyclopedia Entries

References

External links
Meredith Warren's Academia.edu Page

Meredith Warren's Staff Profile for the University of Sheffield
 "Cannibalism in the Christian Imagination," Lecture at Colgate University, 2014
Teaching with Low Stakes Writing Assignments, Ancient Jew Review

McGill University alumni
New Testament scholars
Year of birth missing (living people)
Living people
Female biblical scholars